Eugénie Renique (1780–1836), was a French ballet dancer.  She had a relationship with General André Masséna for many years, and is known to have accompanied him to battle during the Napoleonic wars, sometimes disguised as a man.

References

1780 births
1836 deaths
19th-century French ballet dancers
People of the First French Empire